Sir Thomas Devereux Pile, 1st Baronet (27 February 1856 – 17 January 1931) was an Irish politician. He was a member of the Irish Unionist Alliance. He was the son of Thomas Pile and Anne Poole. He married Caroline Maude Nicholson on 3 May 1882, and they had four children, including Frederick Alfred Pile.

He was a member of Dublin Corporation for the Fitzwilliam ward, and became the Lord Mayor of Dublin in 1900. As Lord Mayor, he welcomed Queen Victoria to Dublin in 1900 when she came to pay tribute to the Irish troops who fought in the Boer War. He was created 1st Baronet Pile, of Kenilworth House, Rathgar, County Dublin on 24 September 1900. He was the last titled person and last unionist politician to be Lord Mayor of Dublin. He held the office of Sheriff of Dublin City in 1898.

References

1856 births
1931 deaths
Lord Mayors of Dublin
People from County Dublin
Irish Unionist Party politicians